Zhongwei Shen (born c. 1964) is a Chinese-American mathematician, currently a Distinguished Professor at University of Kentucky and a Fellow of the American Mathematical Society.

Shen received his B.S. in mathematics from Peking University in 1982 at the age of 18. He has been a visiting scholar at Lanzhou University's School of Mathematics and Statistics on various occasions since 2007. He was named a Changjiang Scholar of Lanzhou University in 2015.

References

1960s births
Living people
University of Kentucky faculty
American mathematicians
University of Chicago alumni
Peking University alumni
Fellows of the American Mathematical Society
Academic staff of Lanzhou University
Chinese mathematicians